Adama Ardile Traoré (born 13 March 2000) is an Ivorian professional footballer who played as a centre-back for Belgian First Division B club Waasland-Beveren.

References

External links 
 

2000 births
Living people
Ivorian footballers
Association football central defenders
Challenger Pro League players
Ivorian expatriate footballers
Expatriate footballers in Belgium
Ivorian expatriate sportspeople in Belgium
S.K. Beveren players